Dred Scott v. Sandford, 60 U.S. (19 How.) 393 (1857), was a landmark decision of the United States Supreme Court that held the U.S. Constitution did not extend American citizenship to people of black African descent, and thus they could not enjoy the rights and privileges the Constitution conferred upon American citizens. The decision is widely considered the worst ever rendered in the Supreme Court's history, being widely denounced for its overt racism, perceived judicial activism and poor legal reasoning, and for its crucial role in the start of the American Civil War four years later. Legal scholar Bernard Schwartz said that it "stands first in any list of the worst Supreme Court decisions". Chief Justice Charles Evans Hughes called it the Court's "greatest self-inflicted wound".

The decision involved the case of Dred Scott, an enslaved black man whose owners had taken him from Missouri, a slave-holding state, into Illinois and the Wisconsin Territory, where slavery was illegal. When his owners later brought him back to Missouri, Scott sued for his freedom and claimed that because he had been taken into "free" U.S. territory, he had automatically been freed and was legally no longer a slave. Scott sued first in Missouri state court, which ruled that he was still a slave under its law. He then sued in U.S. federal court, which ruled against him by deciding that it had to apply Missouri law to the case. He then appealed to the U.S. Supreme Court.

In March 1857, the Supreme Court issued a 7–2 decision against Scott. In an opinion written by Chief Justice Roger Taney, the Court ruled that people of African descent "are not included, and were not intended to be included, under the word 'citizens' in the Constitution, and can therefore claim none of the rights and privileges which that instrument provides for and secures to citizens of the United States". Taney supported his ruling with an extended survey of American state and local laws from the time of the Constitution's drafting in 1787 that purported to show that a "perpetual and impassable barrier was intended to be erected between the white race and the one which they had reduced to slavery". Because the Court ruled that Scott was not an American citizen, he was also not a citizen of any state and, accordingly, could never establish the "diversity of citizenship" that Article III of the U.S. Constitution requires for a U.S. federal court to be able to exercise jurisdiction over a case. After ruling on those issues surrounding Scott, Taney struck down the Missouri Compromise as a limitation on slave owners' property rights that exceeded the U.S. Congress's constitutional powers.

Although Taney and several other justices hoped the decision would settle the slavery controversy, which was increasingly dividing the American public, the decision only exacerbated interstate tension. Taney's majority opinion suited the slaveholding states, but was intensely decried in all the other states. The decision inflamed the national debate over slavery and deepened the divide that led ultimately to the American Civil War. In 1865, after the Union's victory, the Court's ruling in Dred Scott was superseded by the passage of the Thirteenth Amendment to the U.S. Constitution, which abolished slavery, and the Fourteenth Amendment, whose first section guaranteed citizenship for "[a]ll persons born or naturalized in the United States and subject to the jurisdiction thereof".

Historians agree that the Court decision was a major disaster for the nation as it dramatically inflamed tensions leading to the Civil War. According to historian David W. Blight, 1857 was "the great pivot on the road to disunion...largely because of the Dred Scott case, which stoked the fear, distrust and conspiratorial hatred already common in both the North and the South to new levels of intensity." The ruling is widely considered a blatant act of judicial activism with the intent of bringing finality to the territorial crisis resulting from the Louisiana Purchase by creating a constitutional right to own slaves anywhere in the country while permanently disenfranchising all people of African descent. The court's decision to overturn the Missouri Compromise, which had already been replaced with the Kansas–Nebraska Act and thus was a legally moot issue, is cited as proof of this because the latter act was determined by the due process of popular sovereignty, and thus could not be overturned the same way the court did the Missouri compromise. During the United States election of 1860, abolitionists formed the Republican Party that rejected the ruling as being corrupted by partisanship and non-binding because the court had no jurisdiction. Their Presidential nominee, Abraham Lincoln, stated he would not permit slavery anywhere in the country except where it already existed, which directly contradicted the court's ruling. His election is considered the final event that led the Southern states to secede from the Union, igniting the American Civil War.

Background

Political setting

In the late 1810s, a major political dispute arose over the creation of new American states from the vast territory the United States had acquired from France in 1803 through the Louisiana Purchase. The dispute centered on whether the new states would be "free" states, like the Northern states, in which slavery would be illegal, or whether they would be "slave" states, like the Southern states, in which slavery would be legal. The Southern states wanted the new states to be slave states in order to enhance their own political and economic power. The Northern states wanted the new states to be free states for their own political and economic reasons, as well as their moral concerns over allowing the institution of slavery to expand.

In 1820, the U.S. Congress passed legislation known as the "Missouri Compromise" that was intended to resolve the dispute. The Compromise first admitted Maine into the Union as a free state, then created Missouri out of a portion of the Louisiana Purchase territory and admitted it as a slave state; at the same time it prohibited slavery in the area north of the Parallel 36°30′ north, where most of the territory lay. The legal effects of a slaveowner taking his slaves from Missouri into the free territory north of the 36°30′ north parallel, as well as the constitutionality of the Missouri Compromise itself, eventually came to a head in the Dred Scott case.

Dred Scott and John Emerson

Dred Scott was born a slave in Virginia around 1799. Little is known of his early years. His owner, Peter Blow, moved to Alabama in 1818, taking his six slaves along to work a farm near Huntsville. In 1830, Blow gave up farming and settled in St. Louis, Missouri, where he sold Scott to U.S. Army surgeon Dr. John Emerson. After purchasing Scott, Emerson took him to Fort Armstrong in Illinois. A free state, Illinois had been free as a territory under the Northwest Ordinance of 1787, and had prohibited slavery in its constitution in 1819 when it was admitted as a state.

In 1836, Emerson moved with Scott from Illinois to Fort Snelling in the Wisconsin territory in what has become the state of Minnesota. Slavery in the Wisconsin Territory (some of which, including Fort Snelling, was part of the Louisiana Purchase) was prohibited by the U.S. Congress under the Missouri Compromise. During his stay at Fort Snelling, Scott married Harriet Robinson in a civil ceremony by Harriet's owner, Major Lawrence Taliaferro, a justice of the peace who was also an Indian agent. The ceremony would have been unnecessary had Dred Scott been a slave, as slave marriages had no recognition in the law.

In 1837, the army ordered Emerson to Jefferson Barracks Military Post, south of St. Louis. Emerson left Scott and his wife at Fort Snelling, where he leased their services out for profit. By hiring Scott out in a free state, Emerson was effectively bringing the institution of slavery into a free state, which was a direct violation of the Missouri Compromise, the Northwest Ordinance, and the Wisconsin Enabling Act.

Irene Sanford Emerson 
Before the end of the year, the army reassigned Emerson to Fort Jesup in Louisiana, where Emerson married Eliza Irene Sanford in February 1838. Emerson sent for Scott and Harriet, who proceeded to Louisiana to serve their master and his wife. Within months, Emerson was transferred back to Fort Snelling. While en route to Fort Snelling, Scott's daughter Eliza was born on a steamboat under way on the Mississippi River between Illinois and what would become Iowa. Because Eliza was born in free territory, she was technically born as a free person under both federal and state laws. Upon entering Louisiana, the Scotts could have sued for their freedom, but did not. One scholar suggests that, in all likelihood, the Scotts would have been granted their freedom by a Louisiana court, as it had respected laws of free states that slaveholders forfeited their right to slaves if they brought them in for extended periods. This had been the holding in Louisiana state courts for more than 20 years.

Toward the end of 1838, the army reassigned Emerson back to Fort Snelling. By 1840, Emerson's wife Irene returned to St. Louis with their slaves, while Dr. Emerson served in the Seminole War. While in St. Louis, she hired them out. In 1842, Emerson left the army. After he died in the Iowa Territory in 1843, his widow Irene inherited his estate, including the Scotts. For three years after John Emerson's death, she continued to lease out the Scotts as hired slaves. In 1846, Scott attempted to purchase his and his family's freedom, but Irene Emerson refused, prompting Scott to resort to legal recourse.

Procedural history

Scott v. Emerson

First state circuit court trial 
Having been unsuccessful in his attempt to purchase his freedom, Dred Scott, with the help of his legal advisers, sued Emerson for his freedom in the Circuit Court of St. Louis County on April 6, 1846. A separate petition was filed for his wife Harriet, making them the first married couple to file freedom suits in tandem in its 50-year history. They received financial assistance from the family of Dred's previous owner, Peter Blow. Blow's daughter Charlotte was married to Joseph Charless, an officer at the Bank of Missouri. Charless signed legal documents as security for the Scotts and later secured the services of the bank's attorney, Samuel Mansfield Bay, for the trial.

It was expected that the Scotts would win their freedom with relative ease. By 1846, dozens of freedom suits had been won in Missouri by former slaves. Most had claimed their legal right to freedom on the basis that they, or their mothers, had previously lived in free states or territories. Among the most important legal precedents were Winny v. Whitesides and Rachel v. Walker. In Winny v. Whitesides, the Missouri Supreme Court had ruled in 1824 that a person who had been held as a slave in Illinois, where slavery was illegal, and then brought to Missouri, was free by virtue of residence in a free state. In Rachel v. Walker, the state supreme court had ruled that a U.S. Army officer who took a slave to a military post in a territory where slavery was prohibited and retained her there for several years, had thereby "forfeit[ed] his property". Rachel, like Dred Scott, had accompanied her enslaver to Fort Snelling.

Scott was represented by three different lawyers from the filing of the original petition to the time of the actual trial, over one year later. The first was Francis B. Murdoch, a prolific freedom suit attorney who abruptly left St. Louis. Murdoch was replaced by Charles D. Drake, an in-law of the Blow family. When Drake also left the state, Samuel M. Bay took over as the Scotts' lawyer. Irene Emerson was represented by George W. Goode, a proslavery lawyer from Virginia. By the time the case went to trial, it had been reassigned from Judge John M. Krum, who was proslavery, to Judge Alexander Hamilton, who was known to be sympathetic to freedom suits.

Dred Scott v. Irene Emerson finally went to trial for the first time on June 30, 1847. Henry Peter Blow testified in court that his father had owned Dred and sold him to John Emerson. The fact that Scott had been taken to live on free soil was clearly established through depositions from witnesses who had known Scott and Dr. Emerson at Fort Armstrong and Fort Snelling. Grocer Samuel Russell testified that he had hired the Scotts from Irene Emerson and paid her father, Alexander Sanford, for their services. Upon cross examination, however, Russell admitted that the leasing arrangements had actually been made by his wife, Adeline.

Thus, Russell's testimony was ruled hearsay, and the jury returned a verdict for Emerson. This created a seemingly contradictory outcome in which Scott was ordered by the court to remain Irene Emerson's slave, because he had been unable to prove that he was previously Irene Emerson's slave.

First state supreme court appeal 
Bay moved immediately for a new trial on the basis that Scott's case had been lost due to a technicality which could be rectified, rather than the facts. Judge Hamilton finally issued the order for a new trial on December 2, 1847. Two days later, Emerson's lawyer objected to a new trial by filing a bill of exceptions. The case was then taken on writ of error to the Supreme Court of Missouri. Scott's new lawyers, Alexander P. Field and David N. Hall, argued that the writ of error was inappropriate because the lower court had not yet issued a final judgment. The state supreme court agreed unanimously with their position and dismissed Emerson's appeal on June 30, 1848. The main issue before the court at this stage was procedural and no substantive issues were discussed.

Second state circuit court trial 
Before the state supreme court had convened, Goode had presented a motion on behalf of Emerson to have Scott taken into custody and hired out. On March 17, 1848, Judge Hamilton issued the order to the St. Louis County sheriff. Anyone hiring Scott had to post a bond of six-hundred dollars. Wages he earned during that time were placed in escrow, to be paid to the party that prevailed in the lawsuit. Scott would remain in the sheriff's custody or hired out by him until March 18, 1857. One of Scott's lawyers, David N. Hall, hired him starting March 17, 1849.

The St. Louis Fire of 1849, a cholera epidemic, and two continuances delayed the retrial in the St. Louis Circuit Court until January 12, 1850. Irene Emerson was now defended by Hugh A. Garland and Lyman D. Norris, while Scott was represented by Field and Hall. Judge Alexander Hamilton was presiding. The proceedings were similar to the first trial. The same depositions from Catherine A. Anderson and Miles H. Clark were used to establish that Dr. Emerson had taken Scott to free territory.

This time, the hearsay problem was surmounted by a deposition from Adeline Russell stating that she had hired the Scotts from Irene Emerson, thereby proving that Emerson claimed them as her slaves. Samuel Russell testified in court once again that he had paid for their services. The defense then changed strategy and argued in their summation that Mrs. Emerson had every right to hire out Dred Scott, because he had lived with Dr. Emerson at Fort Armstrong and Fort Snelling under military jurisdiction, not under civil law. In doing so, the defense ignored the precedent set by Rachel v. Walker. In his rebuttal, Hall stated that the fact that they were military posts did not matter, and pointed out that Dr. Emerson had left Scott behind at Fort Snelling, hired out to others, after being reassigned to a new post.

The jury quickly returned a verdict in favor of Dred Scott, nominally making him a free man. Judge Hamilton declared Harriet, Eliza and Lizzie Scott to be free as well. Garland moved immediately for a new trial, and was overruled. On February 13, 1850, Emerson's defense filed a bill of exceptions, which was certified by Judge Hamilton, setting into motion another appeal to the Missouri Supreme Court. Counsel for the opposing sides signed an agreement that moving forward, only Dred Scott v. Irene Emerson would be advanced, and that any decision made by the high court would apply to Harriet's suit, also. In 1849 or 1850, Irene Emerson left St. Louis and moved to Springfield, Massachusetts. Her brother, John F. A. Sanford, continued looking after her business interests when she left, and her departure had no impact on the case.

Second state supreme court appeal 
Both parties filed briefs with the Supreme Court of Missouri on March 8, 1850. A busy docket delayed consideration of the case until the October term. By then, the issue of slavery had become politically charged, even within the judiciary. Although the Missouri Supreme Court had not yet overturned precedent in freedom suits, in the 1840s, the court's proslavery justices had explicitly stated their opposition to freeing slaves. After the court convened on October 25, 1850, the two justices who were proslavery anti-Benton Democrats – William Barclay Napton and James Harvey Birch – persuaded John Ferguson Ryland, a Benton Democrat, to join them in a unanimous decision that Dred Scott remained a slave under Missouri law. However, Judge Napton delayed writing the court's opinion for months. Then in August 1851, both Napton and Birch lost their seats in the Missouri Supreme Court, following the state's first supreme court election, with only Ryland remaining as an incumbent. The case thus needed to be considered again by the newly elected court. The reorganized Missouri Supreme Court now included two moderates – Hamilton Gamble and John Ryland – and one staunch proslavery justice, William Scott.

David N. Hall had prepared the brief for Dred Scott, but died in March 1851. Alexander P. Field continued alone as counsel for Dred Scott, and resubmitted the same briefs from 1850 for both sides. On November 29, 1851, the case was taken under consideration, on written briefs alone, and a decision was reached. However, before Judge Scott could write the court's opinion, Lyman Norris, co-counsel for Irene Emerson, obtained permission to submit a new brief he had been preparing, to replace the original one submitted by Garland.

Norris's brief has been characterized as "a sweeping denunciation of the authority of both the [Northwest] Ordinance of 1787 and the Missouri Compromise." Although he stopped short of questioning their constitutionality, Norris questioned their applicability and criticized the early Missouri Supreme Court, ridiculing former Justice George Tompkins as "the great apostle of freedom at that day." 

Reviewing the court's past decisions on freedom suits, Norris acknowledged that if Rachel v. Walker was allowed to stand, his client would lose. Norris then challenged the concept of "once free, always free", and asserted that the court under Tompkins had been wrong to rule that the Ordinance of 1787 remained in force after the ratification of the U.S. Constitution in 1788. Finally, he argued that the Missouri Compromise should be disregarded whenever it interfered with Missouri law, and that the laws of other states should not be enforced, if their enforcement would cause Missouri citizens to lose their property. In support of his argument, he cited Chief Justice Roger B. Taney's opinion in the United States Supreme Court case Strader v. Graham, which argued that the status of a slave returning from a free state must be determined by the slave state itself. According to historian Walter Ehrlich, the closing of Norris's brief was "a racist harangue that not only revealed the prejudices of its author, but also indicated how the Dred Scott case had become a vehicle for the expression of such views". Noting that Norris's proslavery "doctrines" were later incorporated into the court's final decision, Ehrlich writes (emphasis his):From this point on, the Dred Scott case clearly changed from a genuine freedom suit to the controversial political issue for which it became infamous in American history.On March 22, 1852, Judge William Scott announced the decision of the Missouri Supreme Court that Dred Scott remained a slave, and ordered the trial court's judgment to be reversed. Judge Ryland concurred, while Chief Justice Hamilton Gamble dissented. The majority opinion written by Judge Scott focused on the issue of comity or conflict of laws, and relied on states' rights rhetoric:Every State has the right of determining how far, in a spirit of comity, it will respect the laws of other States. Those laws have no intrinsic right to be enforced beyond the limits of the State for which they were enacted. The respect allowed them will depend altogether on their conformity to the policy of our institutions. No State is bound to carry into effect enactments conceived in a spirit hostile to that which pervades her own laws.Judge Scott did not deny the constitutionality of the Missouri Compromise, and acknowledged that its prohibition of slavery was "absolute", but only within the specified territory. Thus, a slave crossing the border could obtain his freedom, but only within the court of the free state. Rejecting the court's own precedent, Scott argued that Once free' did not necessarily mean 'always free. He cited the Kentucky Court of Appeals decision in Graham v. Strader, which had held that a Kentucky slaveowner who permitted a slave to go to Ohio temporarily, did not forfeit ownership of the slave. To justify overturning three decades of precedent, Judge Scott argued that circumstances had changed:Times now are not as they were when the former decisions on this subject were made. Since then not only individuals but States have been possessed with a dark and fell spirit in relation to slavery, whose gratification is sought in the pursuit of measures, whose inevitable consequence must be the overthrow and destruction of our government. Under such circumstances it does not behoove the State of Missouri to show the least countenance to any measure which might gratify this spirit. She is willing to assume her full responsibility for the existence of slavery within her limits, nor does she seek to share or divide it with others.On March 23, 1852, the day after the Missouri Supreme Court decision had been announced, Irene Emerson's lawyers filed an order in the St. Louis Circuit Court for the bonds signed by the Blow family to cover the Scotts' court costs; return of the slaves themselves; and transfer of their wages earned over four years, plus 6 percent interest. On June 29, 1852, Judge Hamilton overruled the order.

Scott v. Sanford 
The case looked hopeless, and the Blow family could no longer pay for Scott's legal costs. Scott also lost both of his lawyers when Alexander Field moved to Louisiana and David Hall died. The case was undertaken pro bono by Roswell Field, who employed Scott as a janitor. Field also discussed the case with LaBeaume, who had taken over the lease on the Scotts in 1851. After the Missouri Supreme Court decision, Judge Hamilton turned down a request by Emerson's lawyers to release the rent payments from escrow and to deliver the slaves into their owner's custody.

In 1853, Dred Scott again sued his current owner John Sanford, but this time in federal court. Sanford returned to New York and the federal courts had diversity jurisdiction under Article III, Section 2 of the U.S. Constitution. In addition to the existing complaints, Scott alleged that Sanford had assaulted his family and held them captive for six hours on January 1, 1853.

At trial in 1854, Judge Robert William Wells directed the jury to rely on Missouri law on the question of Scott's freedom. Since the Missouri Supreme Court had held that Scott remained a slave, the jury found in favor of Sanford. Scott then appealed to the U.S. Supreme Court, where the clerk misspelled the defendant’s name, and the case was recorded as Dred Scott v. Sandford, with an ever-erroneous title. Scott was represented before the Supreme Court by Montgomery Blair and George Ticknor Curtis, whose brother Benjamin was a Supreme Court Justice. Sanford was represented by Reverdy Johnson and Henry S. Geyer.

Sanford as defendant
When the case was filed, the two sides agreed on a statement of facts that claimed Scott had been sold by Dr. Emerson to John Sanford, though this was a legal fiction. Dr. Emerson had died in 1843, and Dred Scott had filed his 1847 suit against Irene Emerson. There is no record of Dred Scott's transfer to Sanford or of his transfer back to Irene. John Sanford died shortly before Scott's manumission, and Scott was not listed in the probate records of Sanford's estate. Also, Sanford was not acting as Dr. Emerson's executor, as he was never appointed by a probate court, and the Emerson estate had been settled when the federal case was filed.

The murky circumstances of ownership led many to conclude the parties to Dred Scott v. Sandford contrived to create a test case. Mrs. Emerson's remarriage to abolitionist U.S. Representative Calvin C. Chaffee seemed suspicious to contemporaries, and Sanford was thought to be a front and to have allowed himself to be sued, despite not actually being Scott's owner. Nevertheless, Sanford had been involved in the case since 1847, before his sister married Chaffee. He had secured counsel for his sister in the state case, and he engaged the same lawyer for his own defense in the federal case. Sanford also consented to be represented by genuine pro-slavery advocates before the Supreme Court, rather than to put up a token defense.

Influence of President Buchanan
Historians discovered that after the Supreme Court heard arguments in the case but before it issued a ruling, President-elect James Buchanan wrote to his friend, Supreme Court Associate Justice John Catron, to ask whether the case would be decided by the Court before his inauguration in March 1857. Buchanan hoped that the decision would quell unrest in the country over the slavery issue by issuing a ruling to take it out of political debate. He later successfully pressured Associate Justice Robert Cooper Grier, a Northerner, to join the Southern majority in Dred Scott to prevent the appearance that the decision was made along sectional lines.  According to historian Paul Finkelman: Buchanan already knew what the Court was going to decide. In a major breach of Court etiquette, Justice Grier, who, like Buchanan, was from Pennsylvania, had kept the President-elect fully informed about the progress of the case and the internal debates within the Court. When Buchanan urged the nation to support the decision, he already knew what Taney would say. Republican suspicions of impropriety turned out to be fully justified. 

Biographer Jean H. Baker argues that Buchanan's use of political pressure on a member of a sitting court was regarded then, as now, to be highly improper. Republicans fueled speculation as to Buchanan's influence by publicizing that Taney had secretly informed Buchanan of the decision. Buchanan declared in his inaugural address that the slavery question would "be speedily and finally settled" by the Supreme Court.

Supreme Court decision
On March 6, 1857, the U.S. Supreme Court ruled against Dred Scott in a 7–2 decision that fills over 200 pages in the United States Reports. The decision contains opinions from all nine justices, but the "majority opinion" has always been the focus of the controversy.

Opinion of the Court

Seven justices formed the majority and joined an opinion written by Chief Justice Roger Taney. Taney began the Court's opinion with what he saw as the core issue in the case: whether or not black people could possess federal citizenship under the U.S. Constitution.

In answer, the Court ruled that they could not. It held that black people could not be American citizens, and therefore a lawsuit to which they were a party could never qualify for the "diversity of citizenship" that Article III of the Constitution requires for American federal courts to have jurisdiction over cases that do not involve federal questions.

The primary rationale for the Court's ruling was Taney's assertion that black African slaves and their descendants were never intended to be part of the American social and political landscape.

Taney then extensively reviewed laws from the original American states that involved the status of black Americans at the time of the Constitution's drafting in 1787. He concluded that these laws showed that a "perpetual and impassable barrier was intended to be erected between the white race and the one which they had reduced to slavery". Thus, he concluded, black people were not American citizens, and could not sue as citizens in federal courts. This meant that U.S. states lacked the power to alter the legal status of black people by granting them state citizenship.

This holding normally would have ended the decision, since it disposed of Dred Scott's case, but Taney did not conclude the matter before the Court in the normal manner. He went on to assess the constitutionality of the Missouri Compromise itself, writing that the Compromise's legal provisions intended to free slaves who were living north of the 36°N latitude line in the western territories. In the Court's judgment, this would constitute the government depriving slaveowners of their propertysince slaves were legally the property of their ownerswithout due process of law, which is forbidden under the Fifth Amendment to the Constitution. Taney also reasoned that the Constitution and the Bill of Rights implicitly precluded any possibility of constitutional rights for black African slaves and their descendants. Thus, Taney concluded:

Taney held that the Missouri Compromise was unconstitutional, marking the first time since the 1803 case Marbury v. Madison that the Supreme Court had struck down a federal law, although the Missouri Compromise had already been effectively overridden by the Kansas–Nebraska Act. Taney made this argument on a narrow definition of the Property Clause of Section 3 of Article 4 of the Constitution. The Property Clause states, "The Congress shall have Power to dispose of and make all needful Rules and Regulations respecting the Territory or other Property belonging to the United States..." Taney made the argument that the Property Clause "applied only to the property which the States held in common at that time, and has no reference whatever to any territory or other property which the new sovereignty might afterwards itself acquire." Taney asserted that because the Northwest Territory was not part of the United States at the time of the Constitution's ratification, Congress did not have the authority to ban slavery in the territory. According to Taney, the Missouri Compromise exceeded the scope of Congress powers and was unconstitutional, and thus Dred Scott was still a slave regardless of his time spent in the parts of the Northwest Territory that were north of 36°N, and he was still a slave under Missouri law, and the Court had to follow Missouri law in the matter. For all these reasons, the Court concluded that Scott could not bring suit in U.S. federal court.

Dissents

Justices Benjamin Robbins Curtis and John McLean were the only two dissenters from the Court's decision, and both filed dissenting opinions.

Curtis's 67-page dissent argued that the Court's conclusion that black people could not possess federal U.S. citizenship was legally and historically baseless. Curtis pointed out that at the time of the Constitution's adoption in 1789, black men could vote in five of the 13 states. Legally, that made them citizens of both their individual states and the United States federally. Curtis cited many state statutes and state court decisions supporting his position. His dissent was "extremely persuasive", and it prompted Taney to add 18 additional pages to his opinion in an attempt to rebut Curtis's arguments.

McLean's dissent deemed the argument that black people could not be citizens "more a matter of taste than of law". He attacked much of the Court's decision as obiter dicta that was not legally authoritative on the ground that once the court determined that it did not have jurisdiction to hear Scott's case, it should have simply dismissed the action, rather than passing judgment on the merits of the claims.

Curtis and McLean both attacked the Court's overturning of the Missouri Compromise on its merits. They noted that it was not necessary to decide the question and that none of the authors of the Constitution had ever objected on constitutional grounds to the Congress's adoption of the antislavery provisions of the Northwest Ordinance passed by the Continental Congress or the subsequent acts that barred slavery north of 36°30' N, or the prohibition on importing slaves from overseas passed in 1808.  Curtis said slavery was not listed in the constitution as a "natural right", but rather a creation of municipal law.  He pointed out the constitution said "The Congress shall have Power to dispose of and make all needful Rules and Regulations respecting the Territory or other Property belonging to the United States; and nothing in this Constitution shall be so construed as to Prejudice any Claims of the United States, or of any particular State."  Since slavery was not mentioned as an exception, he felt a prohibition of it fell within the scope of needed rules and regulations Congress was free to pass.

Reactions
The Supreme Court's decision in Dred Scott was "greeted with unmitigated wrath from every segment of the United States except the slave holding states." The American political historian Robert G. McCloskey described:

Many Republicans, including Abraham Lincoln, who was rapidly becoming the leading Republican in Illinois, regarded the decision as part of a plot to expand and eventually impose the legalization of slavery throughout all of the states. Some southern extremists wanted all states to recognize slavery as a constitutional right.  Lincoln rejected the court's majority opinion that "the right of property in a slave is distinctly and expressly affirmed in the Constitution," pointing out that the constitution did not ever mention property in reference to slaves and in fact explicitly referred to them as "persons". Southern Democrats considered Republicans to be lawless rebels who were provoking disunion by their refusal to accept the Supreme Court's decision as the law of the land. Many northern opponents of slavery offered a legal argument for refusing to recognize the Dred Scott decision on the Missouri Compromise as binding. They argued that the Court's determination that the federal courts had no jurisdiction to hear the case rendered the remainder of the decision obiter dicta—non binding passing remarks rather than an authoritative interpretation of the law. Douglas attacked that position in the Lincoln-Douglas debates:

In a speech at Springfield, Illinois, Lincoln responded that the Republican Party was not seeking to defy the Supreme Court, but he hoped they could convince it to reverse its ruling.

Democrats had refused to accept the court's interpretation of the U.S. Constitution as permanently binding. During the Andrew Jackson administration, Taney, then Attorney General, had written: 

Frederick Douglass, a prominent black abolitionist who considered the decision to be unconstitutional and Taney's reasoning contrary to the Founding Fathers' vision, predicted that political conflict could not be avoided:

According to Jefferson Davis, then a U.S. Senator from Mississippi, and future President of the Confederate States of America, the case merely "presented the question whether Cuffee [a derogatory term for a black person] should be kept in his normal condition or not . . . [and] whether the Congress of the United States could decide what might or might not be property in a Territory–the case being that of an officer of the army sent into a Territory to perform his public duty, having taken with him his negro slave".

Impact on both parties
Irene Emerson moved to Massachusetts in 1850 and married Calvin C. Chaffee, a doctor and abolitionist who was elected to Congress on the Know Nothing and Republican tickets. Following the Supreme Court ruling, pro-slavery newspapers attacked Chaffee as a hypocrite. Chaffee protested that Dred Scott belonged to his brother-in-law and that he had nothing to do with Scott's enslavement. Nevertheless, the Chaffees executed a deed transferring the Scott family to Henry Taylor Blow, the son of Scott's former owner, Peter Blow. Chaffee’s lawyer suggested the transfer as the most convenient way of freeing Scott since Missouri law required manumitters to appear in person before the court.

Taylor Blow filed the manumission papers with Judge Hamilton on May 26, 1857. The emancipation of Dred Scott and his family was national news and was celebrated in northern cities. Scott worked as a porter in a hotel in St. Louis, where he was a minor celebrity. His wife took in laundry. Dred Scott died of tuberculosis on November 7, 1858. Harriet died on June 17, 1876.

Aftermath

Economic
Economist Charles Calomiris and historian Larry Schweikart discovered that uncertainty about whether the entire West would suddenly become slave territory or engulfed in combat like
"Bleeding Kansas" gripped the markets immediately. The east–west railroads collapsed immediately (although north–south lines were unaffected), causing, in turn, the near-collapse of several large banks and the runs that ensued. What followed the runs has been called the Panic of 1857.

The Panic of 1857, unlike the Panic of 1837, almost exclusively impacted the North, a fact that Calomiris and Schweikart attribute to the South's system of branch banking, as opposed to the North's system of unit banking.  In the South's branch banking system, information moved reliably among the branch banks and transmission of the panic was minor.  Northern unit banks, in contrast, were competitors and seldom shared such vital information.

Political

Southerners, who had grown uncomfortable with the Kansas-Nebraska Act, argued that they had a constitutional right to bring slaves into the territories, regardless of any decision by a territorial legislature on the subject. The Dred Scott decision seemed to endorse that view.

Although Taney believed that the decision represented a compromise that would be a final settlement of the slavery question by transforming a contested political issue into a matter of settled law, the decision produced the opposite result. It strengthened Northern opposition to slavery, divided the Democratic Party on sectional lines, encouraged secessionist elements among Southern supporters of slavery to make bolder demands, and strengthened the Republican Party.

In 1860, the Republican Party explicitly rejected the Dred Scott verdict in their official platform, stating "the new dogma that the Constitution, of its own force, carries slavery into any or all of the territories of the United States, is a dangerous political heresy, at variance with the explicit provisions of that instrument itself, with contemporaneous exposition, and with legislative and judicial precedent; is revolutionary in its tendency, and subversive of the peace and harmony of the country."

Later references
In 1859, when defending John Anthony Copeland and Shields Green from the charge of treason, following their participation in John Brown's raid on Harpers Ferry, their attorney, George Sennott, cited the Dred Scott decision in arguing successfully that since they were not citizens according to that Supreme Court ruling, they could not commit treason. The charge of treason was dropped, but they were found guilty and executed on other charges.

Justice John Marshall Harlan was the lone dissenting vote in Plessy v. Ferguson (1896), which declared racial segregation constitutional and created the concept of "separate but equal". In his dissent, Harlan wrote that the majority's opinion would "prove to be quite as pernicious as the decision made by this tribunal in the Dred Scott case".

Charles Evans Hughes, writing in 1927 on the Supreme Court's history, described Dred Scott v. Sandford as a "self-inflicted wound" from which the court would not recover for many years.

In a memo to Justice Robert H. Jackson in 1952, for whom he was clerking, on the subject of Brown v. Board of Education, the future Chief Justice William H. Rehnquist wrote that "Scott v. Sandford was the result of Taney's effort to protect slaveholders from legislative interference."

Justice Antonin Scalia made the comparison between Planned Parenthood v. Casey (1992) and Dred Scott in an effort to see Roe v. Wade overturned:
Dred Scott ... rested upon the concept of "substantive due process" that the Court praises and employs today. Indeed, Dred Scott was very possibly the first application of substantive due process in the Supreme Court, the original precedent for... Roe v. Wade.

Scalia noted that the Dred Scott decision had been written and championed by Taney and left the justice's reputation irrevocably tarnished. Taney, who was attempting to end the disruptive question of the future of slavery, wrote a decision that "inflamed the national debate over slavery and deepened the divide that led ultimately to the American Civil War".

Chief Justice John Roberts compared Obergefell v. Hodges (2015) to Dred Scott, as another example of trying to settle a contentious issue through a ruling that went beyond the scope of the Constitution.

Legacy
 1977: The Scotts' great-grandson John A. Madison, Jr., an attorney, gave the invocation at the ceremony at the Old Courthouse in St. Louis, a National Historic Landmark, for the dedication of a National Historic Marker commemorating the Scotts' case tried there.
 2000: Harriet and Dred Scott's petition papers in their freedom suit were displayed at the main branch of the St. Louis Public Library, following the discovery of more than 300 freedom suits in the archives of the U.S. circuit court.
 2006: A new historic plaque was erected at the Old Courthouse to honor the active roles of both Dred and Harriet Scott in their freedom suit and the case's significance in U.S. history.
 2012: A monument depicting Dred and Harriet Scott was erected at the Old Courthouse's east entrance facing the St. Louis Gateway Arch.

See also
 Anticanon
 American slave court cases
 Origins of the American Civil War
 Timeline of the civil rights movement

Notes

References

Citations

Works cited

Further reading
 Allen, Austin. Origins of the Dred Scott Case: Jacksonian Jurisprudence and the Supreme Court 1837-1857. Athens, Georgia: University of Georgia Press, 2006.
 Dennis-Jonathan Mann & Kai P. Purnhagen: The Nature of Union Citizenship between Autonomy and Dependency on (Member) State Citizenship – A Comparative Analysis of the Rottmann Ruling, or: How to Avoid a European Dred Scott Decision?, in: 29:3 Wisconsin International Law Journal (WILJ), (Fall 2011), pp. 484–533 (PDF).
 Fehrenbacher, Don E., The Dred Scott Case: Its Significance in American Law and Politics. New York:  Oxford (1978) [winner of Pulitzer Prize for History].
 Fehrenbacher, Don E. Slavery, Law, and Politics: The Dred Scott Case in Historical Perspective (1981) [abridged version of The Dred Scott Case].
 Finkelman, Paul. Supreme Injustice: Slavery in the Nation's Highest Court. Cambridge, Massachusetts and London, England: Harvard University Press, 2018. Review
 Konig, David Thomas, Paul Finkelman, and Christopher Alan Bracey, eds. The Dred Scott Case: Historical and Contemporary Perspectives on Race and Law (Ohio University Press; 2010) 272 pages; essays by scholars on the history of the case and its afterlife in American law and society.
 Potter, David M. The Impending Crisis, 1848–1861 (1976) pp. 267–96.
 VanderVelde, Lea.  Mrs. Dred Scott: A Life on Slavery's Frontier (Oxford University Press, 2009) 480 pp.
 
 
 Listen to: American Pendulum II – 🔊 Listen Now: American Pendulum II

External links 

 
 
 
 Primary documents and bibliography about the Dred Scott case, from the Library of Congress
 "Dred Scott decision", Encyclopædia Britannica 2006. Encyclopædia Britannica Online. 17 December 2006. www.yowebsite.com
 Gregory J. Wallance, "Dred Scott Decision: The Lawsuit That Started The Civil War", History.net, originally in Civil War Times Magazine, March/April 2006
 Jefferson National Expansion Memorial, National Park Service
 Infography about the Dred Scott Case
 The Dred Scott Case Collection, Washington University in St. Louis
 Report of the Brown University Steering Committee on Slavery and Justice
 Dred Scott case articles from William Lloyd Garrison's abolitionist newspaper The Liberator
 "Supreme Court Landmark Case Dred Scott v. Sandford" from C-SPAN's Landmark Cases: Historic Supreme Court Decisions
 Report of the Decision of the Supreme Court of the United States and the Opinions of the Judges Thereof, in the Case of Dred Scott Versus John F.A. Sandford. December Term, 1856 via Google Books

1857 in United States case law
Abrogated United States Supreme Court decisions
Freedom suits in the United States
History of St. Louis
Pre-emancipation African-American history
Presidency of James Buchanan
United States slavery case law
United States substantive due process case law
United States Supreme Court cases of the Taney Court
Missouri in the American Civil War
Origins of the American Civil War
Legal history of Missouri
Race and law in the United States
United States Supreme Court cases
United States nationality law